Paphos General Hospital is the Paphos district's main medical centre. With four stories and  this pyramid shaped hospital is designed to offer to patients first aid to MRI Scans. It was opened in 1992 and the hospital currently operates with all the necessary departments. Within there is also a 200-seat auditorium, and there is a heliport right next to the emergency department.

Notes

Hospital buildings completed in 1992
Hospitals in Cyprus
Buildings and structures in Paphos
Hospitals established in 1992